The Biodiversity Conservation Act 2016 is a state-based act of parliament in Western Australia (WA). It came into force on 1 January 2019.  This Act 2016 and its Regulations replace the Sandalwood Act 1929 and the Wildlife Conservation Act 1950, and establish a new framework for the conservation and protection of biodiversity in Western Australia. Unlike the previous legislation, it covers both species and ecological communities, and creates criteria for different types listings, including listing species as "endangered", "critically endangered" or "vulnerable". This brings WA in line with the Environment Protection and Biodiversity Conservation Act 1999.

References

Western Australia legislation
Nature conservation in Australia
Environmental law in Australia
Environment of Australian Capital Territory
2010s in Australia
2016 establishments in Australia
2016 in the environment